Forever Love is a 2014 Chinese romantic comedy-drama film directed by Zhao Yiran and Wei Jie. It was released in China on January 1, 2014.

Cast
Li Weijia
Jiang Chao
Teddy Lin
Du Haitao
Liu Mengmeng 
Xia Yiyao 
Shen Tingting
Peng Bo

Reception
The film earned ¥0.54 million at the Chinese box office.

References

2014 romantic comedy-drama films
Chinese romantic comedy-drama films
2014 comedy films
2014 drama films